The Jawaharlal Nehru Engineering College (JNEC) is an engineering college in Aurangabad CIDCO, India. It was established in 1982 and is affiliated with the Dr. Babasaheb Ambedkar Technological University in Maharashtra.

The school is financed and run by the Mahatma Gandhi Mission (MGM). Dr. H. H. Shinde is the principal of the institute.

History 
MGM established an educational trust in 1982 under the guidance of former Education Minister Shri Kamalkishore Kadam and a group of founder members, mostly made up of academics. The trust established its pioneer institute in the historical city of Aurangabad, home to the UNESCO World Heritage Sites the Ajanta Caves & Ellora Caves, but lacking in premier educational institutes.

Campus 
The foundation stone of the existing MGM's JNEC building was laid on 14 November 1985 by Sharad Pawar, the Chief Minister of Maharashtra. The college started functioning as a part of Vivekanand College, in Samarth Nagar, Aurangabad, but on September 1988 it was moved to a new location. Initially, the college campus consisted of one arm of the building (the North arm), with the chemistry lab, workshop, production lab, and library spread about it. The computer lab was opened with much fanfare in 1987. The current campus hosts dormitories for boys and girls, a sports facility, a canteen, and a bank. It is shared with other colleges under the MGM banner.

Sports 
MGM's Jawaharlal Nehru Engineering College Sports Complex is a sports complex within Jawaharlal Nehru Engineering College. The facilities available for sports activities include a 400-meter synthetic track, a football field-cum-cricket ground with 63.5 meters of boundary, a stadium pavilion, and courts for games like hockey, volleyball, basketball, kho-kho, kabaddi, and ball badminton. Facilities are available for indoor games like table tennis, carom, chess, wrestling, weightlifting, and powerlifting.

Alumni 
Since 1983, approximately 10,000 students have pursued their bachelor's at the college. The college established an alumni association to keep in touch with alumni. Previously, an informal alumni association existed, but it is now registered under the association vide letter no MHA/497/04 dated 30 July 2004. , JNEC Alumni association has 2041 members.

Executive body
President: Shankar Jhunjhunwala
Vice President: Shrikant Badve
Secretary: Jeevan Salunke
Treasurer: B.M.Patil
Faculty Leader: P.B. Murmude
Convener: A.B. Kulkarni

See other
 MGM College of Food Technology
 Jawaharlal Nehru Engineering College Sports Complex

References

All India Council for Technical Education
Engineering colleges in Maharashtra
Education in Aurangabad, Maharashtra
Educational institutions established in 1982
Monuments and memorials to Jawaharlal Nehru
1982 establishments in Maharashtra